Magadh Mahila College, established in 1946, is a women's college in Patna, Bihar. It is affiliated to Patna University, and offers undergraduate and postgraduate courses in science, arts and commerce.

Accreditation
Magadh Mahila College was awarded A grade by the National Assessment and Accreditation Council (NAAC).

References

External links
 

Colleges affiliated to Patna University
Educational institutions established in 1946
Universities and colleges in Patna
1946 establishments in India